Dismorphia melia is a butterfly in the  family Pieridae. It is found in Brazil, including Minas Gerais, Santa Catarina and Rio de Janeiro.

References

Dismorphiinae
Butterflies described in 1824
Fauna of Brazil
Pieridae of South America